Magic triangle can refer to:

Magic Triangle (Dave Douglas album), an album by trumpeter Dave Douglas
Magic triangle (mathematics), a mathematical concept, also called a perimeter magic triangle
The Magic Triangle, an album by American jazz pianist Don Pullen